Anita V. Figueredo (August 24, 1916 – February 19, 2010) was an American surgeon and philanthropist, the first woman medical doctor from Costa Rica and the first woman surgeon to practice in San Diego, California. She was posthumously inducted into the San Diego Women's Hall of Fame in 2015.

Early life and education
Figueredo was born in Costa Rica, the daughter of Roberto Figueredo, a well-known Cuban-born soccer player. She was raised by her mother, Sarita Villegas, in Spanish Harlem after they immigrated in 1921. She enrolled at Manhattanville College of the Sacred Heart at age 15 with a full scholarship, and graduated in 1936. She was one of four women admitted to Long Island Medical College in her year.  

Anita Figueredo was one of the first two women surgical residents at Memorial Hospital for Cancer in New York, during World War II when many male medical students were serving in the military. She was the first woman from Costa Rica to earn a medical degree.

Career
While she was a young doctor on staff at Memorial in New York, Figueredo was one of the Pan-American women delegates to formulate a declaration of human rights for the Paris Treaty process in 1946. Figueredo presented the group's resolutions for approval, which was unanimous.

Figueredo spent most of her career as a surgical oncologist at Scripps Memorial Hospital in southern California. She was the first woman surgeon in San Diego. She was known for standing on a stool to perform surgery, as she was under five feet in height.

As a philanthropist, Figueredo co-founded Friends of the Poor in 1982, a charity to bring food, clothing and medical care to underserved places, initially in Baja California; the organization later maintained projects on three continents.  In the 1950s she began a long and close association with Mother Teresa. She was also a founding board member of the San Diego College for Women, and a backer of the San Diego Women's Bank.

In 1954, Figueredo was honored by Pope Pius XII with a papal medal, the Pro Ecclesia et Pontifice, for her service work. Figueredo was a trustee of the La Jolla Town Council from 1956 to 1968. In 2009 she won Scripps Memorial Hospital's Lifetime Achievement Award.  A biography of Figueredo, written by her oldest daughter Sarita Eastman, was published in 2009.

Personal life
Anita Figueredo married fellow doctor William J. Doyle in 1942. They were married 58 years until she was widowed in 1999. They had nine children, six of whom survived her.

Anita Figueredo died in 2010, at age 93, at home in La Jolla, California, after a cerebral hemorrhage. She was posthumously inducted into the San Diego Women's Hall of Fame in 2015.

References

External links
Friends of the Poor US, official website.
The Office of War Information (1944), "The personal and professional life of Dr. Anita Figueredo, a woman surgeon at St. Elizabeth's Hospital" (a set of nine photographs)

1916 births
2010 deaths
American surgeons
Manhattanville College alumni
People from La Jolla, San Diego
Women surgeons
People from East Harlem
Costa Rican emigrants to the United States